Manuel Lombardo (born 4 December 1998) is an Italian judoka. He is a gold medalist at both the Mediterranean Games and the European Judo Championships. He is also a silver medalist at the World Judo Championships.

Career
In 2018, he won the gold medal in the men's 66 kg event at the Mediterranean Games held in Tarragona, Spain.

He won the gold medal in the men's 66 kg event at the 2021 European Judo Championships held in Lisbon, Portugal.

He lost his bronze medal match in the men's 66 kg event at the 2020 Summer Olympics in Tokyo, Japan.

He won the silver medal in the men's 73 kg event at the 2022 Judo Grand Slam Antalya held in Antalya, Turkey. He lost his bronze medal match in the men's 73 kg event at the 2022 Mediterranean Games held in Oran, Algeria.

Achievements

References

External links
 
 
 

Living people
1998 births
Sportspeople from Turin
Italian male judoka
Mediterranean Games gold medalists for Italy
Mediterranean Games medalists in judo
Competitors at the 2018 Mediterranean Games
Competitors at the 2022 Mediterranean Games
European Games competitors for Italy
Judoka at the 2019 European Games
Judoka at the 2020 Summer Olympics
Olympic judoka of Italy
21st-century Italian people